In the Netherlands, from the entry into force of the Advisory Referendum Act (Wet raadgevend referendum) on 1 July 2015, until its repeal on 18 February 2018, most types of primary laws could be subjected to a suspensory, non-binding referendum if requested shortly after royal assent and subsequent proclamation. If a law was rejected by more than half of the votes cast, with a mandatory turnout of at least 30%, its entry into force was to be suspended indefinitely and a follow-up law had to be enacted that either repealed the law or provided for its entry into force.

The Dutch Constitution has no provisions on referendums, which means that any referendum held at a national or local level cannot be binding as long as the Constitution gives primacy to legislatures. The first reading of a constitutional amendment to introduce a binding, abrogative referendum at national, provincial, municipal and water-board level was completed on 15 October 2014. A second reading of a constitutional amendment proposal cannot take place until after the next general election and would have required a two-thirds majority in both chambers of the States General. A previous attempt failed in May 1999 when the bill was rejected in second reading in the Senate due to VVD Senator Hans Wiegel rebelling against his own party.

Since the constitutional referendum of the Batavian Republic in 1805, only three referendums have been held. The first was the consultative, ad hoc referendum on the European Constitution in 2005. The second was the referendum on the ratification of the Ukraine–EU Association Agreement on 6 April 2016, which was the first referendum under the Advisory Referendum Act. On 21 March 2018, the 2018 Dutch Intelligence and Security Services Act referendum was held.

Legal history
In the Netherlands, bills are generally submitted by the Government, but also individual members of the House of Representatives have the right to introduce bills. In 2005, Members of Parliament Niesco Dubbelboer (Labour), Wijnand Duyvendak (GreenLeft) and Boris van der Ham (Democrats 66) introduced the bill that would become the Advisory Referendum Act. Its accompanying explanatory memorandum started with a quote of former US president Theodore Roosevelt: "I believe in the [...] referendum, which should be used not to destroy representative government, but to correct it whenever it becomes misrepresentative." The bill's initial sponsors were succeeded by Paul Kalma (Labour), Femke Halsema (GreenLeft), Pierre Heijnen (Labour), Jolande Sap (GreenLeft), Linda Voortman (GreenLeft), Gerard Schouw (Democrats 66) and Manon Fokke (Labour) before it was adopted by both chambers.

The bill passed the House of Representatives on 14 February 2013 with 98 votes in favour and 52 against. All parties except the coalition party People's Party for Freedom and Democracy and the three Christian parties – Christian Democratic Appeal, ChristianUnion and the Reformed Political Party – voted in favour. In the Senate, the opposing votes came from the same four parties and the bill passed with 45 votes in favour and 30 against. It was signed into law on 30 September 2014 and entered into force on 1 July 2015.

In 2018 however, both the assembly and senate voted to repeal the referendum law

Provisions
Under the Advisory Referendum Act, a referendum could be requested for any piece of primary legislation, including treaty ratifications, after it was signed into law and published in the Staatscourant, but generally before it enters into force (subject to exceptions). The law excluded several subjects, such as laws concerning: the monarchy or royal family, the national budget, constitutional amendments, legislation passed solely for the execution of treaties or decisions of intergovernmental organisations, Kingdom acts (unless they will solely apply to the Netherlands) and legislation passed in response to a previous referendum.

The request procedure of a referendum consisted of two stages. For the preliminary request, 10,000 requests had to be received within four weeks after proclamation of the law. Upon completion of this stage, the provisions concerning entry into force of the law in question were suspended until the procedure has come to an end. For the definitive request, 300,000 requests had to be received within six weeks after the completion of the preliminary request. If this was not successful, the 30% turnout had not been met or the law is approved, then the law could enter into effect by royal decree. If the law was rejected, then the suspension is indefinite and a follow-up law must be enacted that either repeals the law or overrides the suspended provisions to let the law enter into force after all.

A referendum commission was appointed by the government every four years. The commission decided the referendum date and question, subsidies for campaigns ("for" as well as "against") and gave neutral information on the referendum question. On 1 October 2015 the first referendum commission was installed. It was chaired by Medy van der Laan, and further consisted of A.B. Blomberg, Willemien Den Ouden, Ruud Koole and Reint Jan Renes.

Criticism of the turnout requirement 
The Advisory Referendum Act has been criticised for its turnout requirement. Senior lecturer Casper Albers from the University of Groningen argued that the requirement would lead to an " player" variant of the prisoner's dilemma. Due to the turnout requirement, proponents can choose whether to vote to achieve the desired outcome, whereas opponents must vote. This consideration can affect the outcome if proponents contribute decisively to the turnout and a majority votes against.

In the run-up to the Ukraine–EU Association Agreement referendum in 2016, some analysts estimated that the turnout would be around 30%, expressing doubt that the requirement would be met. The referendum had a turnout of 32.28% with a majority of 61% against. Minister of the Interior Ronald Plasterk committed to an evaluation of the Act.

Referendums and referendum requests
As of October 2017, 2 acts have received enough preliminary requests (>10,000) to move to the definitive request stage. For one act sufficient definitive requests were obtained (>300,000) for a referendum. A list of acts for which more than 50 preliminary requests were received is shown below.

Ukraine-EU association agreement referendum requests

The first referendum held based on the Consultative Referendum Act concerned the approval act of the Association Agreement between the European Union and Ukraine and was held in on 6 April 2016. The referendum question was: "Are you for or against the Approval Act of the Association Agreement between the European Union and Ukraine?"

With a turnout of 32.28%, the threshold for a valid referendum was met. 61% of the votes cast were against the Approval Act, but accounted for only 19.5% of eligible voters. As the Act was rejected, the States General had to enact a follow-up law to either repeal the Act or put it into effect after all. Following the vote, the government secured an additional agreement between the 28 Member States of the European Union addressing what were according to the government the concerns of the no-vote in December 2017. The additional agreement did not change the association agreement and neither Ukraine nor the European Union or Euratom were parties to the additional agreement. Following the approval of the additional agreement, a new law was passed approving the Assocication Agreement in May 2017, enabling the Netherlands to deposit its instrument of ratification on 15 June 2017. The association agreement entered into force on 1 September 2017.

Temporary and ad hoc referendum measures
Before 2015, there was no permanent provision in law for a referendum. However, from 2002 until 2005, a Temporary Referendum Act in place, which allowed for non-binding referendums, known in Dutch as volksraadpleging ("people's consultation"), to be organised for laws already approved by the House of Representatives. No referendum was called based on this law.

In order to hold the 2005 referendum on the Treaty establishing a Constitution for Europe, a different law was temporarily put in place. That referendum was the first national referendum in the Netherlands since the 1805 referendum in the Batavian Republic, and it was the result of an initiative proposal by parliamentarians Farah Karimi (GreenLeft), Niesco Dubbelboer (Labour) and Boris van der Ham (Democrats 66), who also initiated the Consultative Referendum Act.

References